Ethmia prattiella is a moth in the family Depressariidae. It is found in southern North America from west-central Texas to eastern central Mexico.

The ground color of the forewings is white, with markings consisting of small black dots. The ground color of the hindwings is uniform pale brown. Adults are on wing in January (in central Mexico), in April (in Texas) and in July (in northern Mexico).

References

Moths described in 1915
prattiella